English Bread and Yeast Cookery is an English cookery book by Elizabeth David, first published in 1977. The work consists of a history of bread-making in England, improvements to the process developed in Europe, an examination of the ingredients used and recipes of different types of bread.

Background and writing history

The food writer Elizabeth David had published six books and several booklets before 1977. Her first works had been about the foods of the Mediterranean, France and Italy, but she had also begun to write about English cuisine; her first book on the subject was the 1970 work Spices, Salt and Aromatics in the English Kitchen.

English Bread and Yeast Cookery was David's second book on English food, which she spent five years researching and writing. Some of the research was undertaken with Jill Norman, her friend and publisher. She was angered by the standard of bread in Britain and wrote:

What is utterly dismaying is the mess our milling and baking concerns succeed in making with the dearly bought grain that goes into their grist. Quite simply it is wasted on a nation that cares so little about the quality of its bread that it has allowed itself to be mesmerized into buying the equivalent of eight and a quarter million large white factory-made loaves every day of the year.

In the book, David reproduced a newspaper cartoon published during a bakers' strike in 1974, showing one housewife telling another, "I've been giving them sliced bathroom sponge, and they haven't noticed yet."

Book

The work covered the history of bread-making in England and an examination of each ingredient used. David follows the pattern of Spices, Salt and Aromatics in the English Kitchen, devoting the first part of the book to history and the second to recipes. Reviewing the new book, the food writer Jane Grigson wrote "Mrs. David gives the history of wheat and milling … She goes into weights and cost from the establishment in 1266 of the Assize of Bread up to present-day regulations, with a separate chapter on costing your own bread vis-à-vis bought loaves."

In the second part, David devotes chapters to recipes for various forms of baking. Bread comes first, followed by recipes for, among many other things, buns, yeast cakes, soda-bread, brioches, croissants, pain au chocolat and pizza. As in her earlier books, the recipes are interspersed with excerpts from earlier authors, including Fernand Braudel, Auguste Escoffier, and the painter John Constable.

Contents
The following list refers to the 1977 edition.

 Acknowledgements
 Introduction
 Table of Contents
 Part I: History and Background
 Our Bread Grain: Wheat, Rye, Barley, Oats and Pease
 Milling
 Bread Flours and Meals
 Yeast
 Salt
 Liquids and Fats used in Breadmaking
 Eggs, Dried Fruit, Sugar, Spices and Flavourings used in Yeast Cakes and Breads
 Malt Extracts
 Bread Ovens
 The Bread Factories
 Shapes and Names of English Loaves
 Moulds and Tins for Bread and Yeast Cakes
 Storage of Meal and Flour
 Storage of Bread
 Weights of Loaves and the Assize of Bread
 Weights, Measures and Temperatures
 Weighing and Measuring Equipment
 The Cost of Baking your Own Bread
 Part II: Recipes
 Bread
 Baps and Rolls
 Manchets and Mayn and Payndemayn
 Crumpets and Muffins
 Notes on French Bread
 The Pizza and the Pissaladière
 Quiches and Yeast Dough
 Sausage in Brioche Crust
 Yeast Leavened Pancakes and Oatcakes
 Dumplings and Doughnuts
 Regional and Festival Yeast Cakes and Fruit Breads
 Yeast Buns and Small Tea Cakes
 French Yeast Cakes
 Soda Breads
 Bakestone Cakes and Bread
 Toast
 Bibliography and Further Reading List
 Index

Release and reception

In 1977 David was badly injured in a car accident—sustaining a fractured left elbow and right wrist, a damaged knee cap and a broken jaw—from which she took a long time to recover. English Bread and Yeast Cookery was published while she was in hospital. Its scholarship won high praise, and Jane Grigson, writing in The Times Literary Supplement, suggested that a copy of the book should be given to every marrying couple.

In The Observer, Hilary Spurling called the book "a scathing indictment of the British bread industry" and also "a history of virtually every development since Stone Age crops and querns". Spurling rejoiced in the range of David's recipes, and thought the book was done with "orderliness, authority, phenomenal scope and fastidious attention to detail". Roger Baker, reviewing in The Times wrote "This is probably Mrs. David's most academic work yet. However, not one ounce of the familiar charm, good sense, asperity (reserved for modern commercial white bread), clarity or warmth is missing."

Publishing history
The book was published by Allen Lane in hardback and Penguin Books in paperback, with reprints in 1978 and 1979. The first American edition was published by Viking Press in 1980, and a rewritten American edition was published by Penguin in 1982. In 1995, Biscuit Books of Newton, Mass. published a new American edition. A new edition was published in London by Grub Street books in 2010.

Notes and references

Notes

References

Sources

 
 
  
 
 
 
 
 
 

1977 non-fiction books
English cuisine
British cookbooks